D'Urville Island is an island of Antarctica.

The single island was charted in 1902 by the Swedish Antarctic Expedition under Otto Nordenskiöld, who named it for Captain Jules Dumont d'Urville, French explorer who discovered land in the Joinville Island group.

Burden Passage separates D'Urville Island from Bransfield Island.

See also 
 Composite Antarctic Gazetteer
 List of Antarctic and sub-Antarctic islands
 List of Antarctic islands south of 60° S
 Medley Rocks
 SCAR 
 Territorial claims in Antarctica

References

Islands of the Joinville Island group